Anna Normann (born 20 August 1984) is a Swedish sport shooter. She won the silver medal in the mixed 50 m rifle prone SH1 event at the 2020 Summer Paralympics held in Tokyo, Japan.

References

1984 births
Living people
Swedish female sport shooters
ISSF rifle shooters
Paralympic shooters of Sweden
Paralympic silver medalists for Sweden
Paralympic medalists in shooting
Medalists at the 2020 Summer Paralympics
Shooters at the 2020 Summer Paralympics
21st-century Swedish women